

England

Head Coach: Clive Woodward

 Neil Back (c.)*
 Iain Balshaw
 Kyran Bracken
 Ben Cohen
 Martin Corry
 Lawrence Dallaglio
 Matt Dawson
 Nick Duncombe
 Will Greenwood
 Danny Grewcock
 Austin Healey
 Richard Hill
 Charlie Hodgson
 Martin Johnson (c.)
 Ben Kay
 Jason Leonard
 Dan Luger
 Lewis Moody
 Henry Paul
 Mark Regan
 Jason Robinson
 Graham Rowntree
 Tim Stimpson
 Steve Thompson
 Mike Tindall
 Phil Vickery
 Dorian West
 Julian White
 Jonny Wilkinson
 Joe Worsley

*captain in the last game

France

Head Coach: Bernard Laporte

 Alexandre Albouy
 Alexandre Audebert
 David Auradou
 Olivier Azam
 Serge Betsen
 David Bory
 Olivier Brouzet
 Yannick Bru
 Sébastien Bruno
 Nicolas Brusque
 Jean-Jacques Crenca
 Pieter de Villiers
 Fabien Galthié (c.)***
 Xavier Garbajosa
 François Gelez
 Steven Hall
 Imanol Harinordoquy
 Raphaël Ibañez (c.)**
 Nicolas Jeanjean
 Olivier Magne (c.)*
 Sylvain Marconnet
 Jimmy Marlu
 Tony Marsh
 Remy Martin
 Gérald Merceron
 Frédéric Michalak
 Pierre Mignoni
 Olivier Milloud
 Fabien Pelous
 Jean-Baptiste Poux
 Thibaut Privat
 Aurélien Rougerie
 Damien Traille
 Elvis Vermeulen

*captain in the first game
**captain in the second game
***captain in the third, fourth and fifth games

Ireland

Head Coach: Eddie O'Sullivan

 Shane Byrne
 Peter Clohessy
 Girvan Dempsey
 Guy Easterby
 Simon Easterby
 Anthony Foley
 Mick Galwey (c.)*
 Keith Gleeson
 John Hayes
 Rob Henderson
 Denis Hickie
 Shane Horgan
 Tyrone Howe
 David Humphreys (c.)**
 John Kelly
 Gary Longwell
 Kevin Maggs
 Eric Miller
 Geordan Murphy
 Paul O'Connell
 Brian O'Driscoll
 Ronan O'Gara
 Malcolm O'Kelly
 Frankie Sheahan
 Peter Stringer
 David Wallace
 Paul Wallace
 Keith Wood (c.)***

*captain in the first three games
**captain in the fourth game
***captain in the fifth game

Italy

Head Coach: Brad Johnstone

 Andrea Benatti
 Mauro Bergamasco
 Mirco Bergamasco
 Marco Bortolami
 Carlo Checchinato
 Denis Dallan
 Giampiero de Carli
 Andrea De Rossi
 Santiago Dellapè
 Diego Dominguez
 Mark Giacheri
 Andrea Lo Cicero
 Luca Martin
 Matteo Mazzantini
 Francesco Mazzariol
 Nicola Mazzucato
 Alessandro Moreno
 Andrea Moretti
 Alessandro Moscardi (c.)
 Andrea Muraro
 Carlos Nieto
 Roberto Pedrazzi
 Gert Peens
 Aaron Persico
 Salvatore Perugini
 Ramiro Pez
 Matthew Phillips
 Federico Pucciariello
 Juan Manuel Queirolo
 Giovanni Raineri
 Cristian Stoica
 Alessandro Troncon
 Paolo Vaccari
 Cristian Zanoletti

Scotland

Head Coach: Ian McGeechan

 Graeme Beveridge
 Gordon Bulloch
 George Graham
 Stuart Grimes
 Andrew Henderson
 Duncan Hodge
 Brendan Laney
 John Leslie
 Martin Leslie
 Kenny Logan
 James McLaren
 Glenn Metcalfe
 Andrew Mower
 Scott Murray
 Andy Nicol
 Chris Paterson
 Jon Petrie
 Budge Pountney (c.)*
 Bryan Redpath (c.)
 Robbie Russell
 Tom Smith
 Jon Steel
 Mattie Stewart
 Simon Taylor
 Gregor Townsend
 Jason White

*captain in the first game

Wales

Head Coach: Graham Henry

 Chris Anthony
 Nathan Budgett
 Colin Charvis (c.)*
 Ian Gough
 Iestyn Harris
 Rob Howley
 Dafydd James
 Spencer John
 Duncan Jones
 Stephen Jones
 Gareth Llewellyn
 Andy Marinos
 Robin McBryde
 Andy Moore
 Craig Morgan
 Kevin Morgan
 Dwayne Peel
 Craig Quinnell
 Scott Quinnell (c.)
 Jamie Robinson
 Nicky Robinson
 Tom Shanklin
 Brett Sinkinson
 Mark Taylor
 Gareth Thomas
 Gavin Thomas
 Iestyn Thomas
 Barry Williams
 Martyn Williams
 Rhys Williams
 Chris Wyatt

*captain in the last game

External links

2002
2002 Six Nations Championship